Suguri (written: 村主) is a Japanese surname. Notable people with the surname include:

, Japanese figure skater
, Japanese footballer

See also
Suguru

Japanese-language surnames